SPF may refer to:

Science and technology
 Sun protection factor, of sunscreen
 Specific-pathogen-free, laboratory animals known to be without pathogens
 Superplastic forming, of sheet metal
 Space Power Facility, a NASA test facility
 S-phase-promoting factor, in biology
 Formal spectrum of a ring, a construction in algebraic geometry
 Spray polyurethane foam, a building insulation material
 Spruce-pine-fir, mixed softwood timber

Computing
 Sender Policy Framework, for email authentication
 Shortest Path First, or Dijkstra's algorithm
 IBM  Structured Programming Facility, later ISPF

Organizations
 , the oldest poetry society in France
 , the Argentine Federal Penitentiary Service
  (Conspiracy of Fire Nuclei), Greek terrorist organization

Police
 Scottish Police Federation
 Singapore Police Force
 Somali Police Force
 Special Police Force, a unit within a police force

Economics
 Survey of Professional Forecasters, US macroeconomic forecasts survey
 ECB Survey of Professional Forecasters, macroeconomic forecasts

Other uses
 Security Policy Framework, UK
 Social protection floor
 Annual Summer Play Festival, New York City, US
 Black Hills Airport (IATA airport code), South Dakota, US
 Sherwood Park Freeway, Edmonton, Alberta, Canada
 Springfield railway station, station code

See also
 Single point of failure (SPOF)
 Socialist Party of Florida (SPFL)